The Archdeacon of Norfolk is a senior ecclesiastical officer in the Church of England Diocese of Norwich, who exercises supervision of clergy and responsibility for church buildings within the geographical area of their archdeaconry.

The current archdeacon is Steven Betts who was appointed in 2012.

History
The ancient Archdeaconry of Norfolk has been an ecclesiastical jurisdiction within the Diocese of Norwich since its creation around 1100 – at which time the first archdeacons were being appointed across the nation.

List of archdeacons

High Medieval

bef. 1127–aft. 1166: Roger
bef. 1174–aft. 1181: Steingrim
bef. 1196–aft. 1197: John
bef. 1198–aft. 1218: Geoffrey de Bocland
bef. 1227–1228 (res.): Martin of Pattishall (afterwards Dean of St Paul's, 1228)
bef. 1230–aft. 1232: Robert de Bilneia
bef. 1233–aft. 1233: R-
bef. 1236–1237: Ralph de Blonvilla (de Blundeville)
1237: Thomas de Lecche
1237–bef. 1245: Ralph de Blonvilla (again)
bef. 1239–1240: Simon the Norman
bef. 1239–1257 (res.): Walter de Salerne/de Saleron alias of London (also Dean of St Paul's from 1254)
9 July 1257–aft. 1264: Nicholas de Plimpton
bef. 1267–aft. 1292: Alan de Freston

Late Medieval
bef. 1325–aft. 1325: R. de S. (possibly Richard de Stanhowe)
bef. 1326–bef. 1326: Thomas de Kerdeston
25 July 1326–bef. 1327 (res.): William de Herlaston
bef. 1327–bef. 1335 (res.): Adam de Ayremynne
16 April 1335–bef. 1335: John Newland
25 June 1335–bef. 1359 (d.): Robert de Usflet
4 March–22 June 1351 (rev.): John de Harewell
22 May 1359–bef. 1374 (d.): William de Blythe
20 June 1359–September 1359 (rev.): Richard de Ravenser
13 March 1374 – 1375 (dep.): Robert de Prees/Prots
28 March 1375–bef. 1385 (res.): John de Freton
18 August 1385 – 1390 (res.): Richard de Medeford/Mitford
Period of dispute:
11 April 1390–bef. 1398 (deprived): John de Middleton
1392 (claim): Robert de Prees/Prots (again)
bef. 1391–aft. 1394: James Dardani
20 November 1398 – 1399 (rev.): Ralph Selby
1399–1399 (res.): John de Middleton (again)
29 October 1399 – 1406 (res.): Thomas Langley
2 September 1406–bef. 1408 (res.): Richard Dereham
30 October 1408–bef. 1412 (res.): John Macworth
1 July 1412–bef. 1418 (res.): Richard Dereham (again)
18 February 1418 – 1419 (res.): Philip Morgan
21 December 1419–bef. 1448 (d.): William Sponne
14 February 1449 – 1459 (res.): John Hales
23 November 1459 – 3 January 1477 (exch.): Thomas Marke
3 January 1477 – 1478 (res.): John Morton

27 February 1479 – 1500 (d.): Oliver Dynham
7 November 1500–bef. 1522 (d.): Christopher Urswick, Dean of Windsor until 1505 and Rector of Hackney from 1502 (also Archdeacon of Wilts; Archdeacon of Richmond until 1500 and Archdeacon of Oxford from 1504)
6 April 1522–aft. 1527 (res.): William Stillington
bef. 1529–bef. 1530 (res.): Thomas Wynter (also Dean of Wells {until June 1529}, Archdeacon of York and Archdeacon of Richmond {until 1529})
1 March 1530 – 1531 (res.): Stephen Gardiner
2 April 1531 – 1547 (d.): William Newton

Early modern
1548–?: Alexander Carew
1552–aft. 1567: Matthew Carew (deprived)
6 April 1587–bef. 1619 (d.): Richard Stokes
18 December 1619–bef. 1621 (d.): Francis Mason
28 December 1621–bef. 1629 (d.): Thomas Muriell
18 October 1629–?: Writhlington White
23 September 1631–bef. 1657 (d.): Robert White
24 August 1660 – 15 January 1661 (d.): Philip Tenison
15 February 1661 – 28 June 1698 (d.): Edward Reynolds
20 July 1698 – 1708 (res.): Charles Trimnell
11 March 1708 – 1721 (res.): Robert Cannon (afterwards Dean of Lincoln)
7 December 1721 – 1732 (res.): Thomas Tanner
17 June 1732 – 1733 (res.): John Baron (afterwards Dean of Norwich)
22 November 1734 – 1756 (d.): Samuel Salter
16 September 1756 – 14 May 1768 (d.): Samuel Stedman
28 May 1768 – 1 November 1797 (d.): Thomas Warburton
1 December 1797 – 31 January 1847 (d.): John Oldershaw
13 August 1847 – 20 December 1849 (d.): Philip Jennings
20 December 1850–bef. 1869 (res.): William Bouverie

Late modern
1869–1874 (res.): Ralph Blakelock (died 1 March 1882)
1874–17 October 1900 (d.): Henry Nevill
1900–1901 (d.): William Pelham-Burn
1901–1916 (ret.): Sidney Pelham
1916–1918 (res.): Charles Lisle Carr
1918–1920 (res.): George MacDermott
1920–1934 (ret.): Augustus Buckland
1934–5 October 1954 (d.): Arthur Moore
1955–1962 (ret.): Louis Baggott (afterwards archdeacon emeritus)
1962–13 August 1976 (d.): Eric Cordingly (also Bishop suffragan of Thetford from 1963)
1977–1993 (ret.): Peter Dawson (afterwards archdeacon emeritus)
1993–2002 (ret.): Michael Handley (afterwards archdeacon emeritus)
2002–28 February 2012 (ret.): David Hayden
29 April 2012–present: Steven Betts

Notes

References

Sources

Lists of Anglicans
 
Lists of English people